Events in the year 1710 in India.

Incumbents 

 Mughal emperor: Bahadur Shah I

Events
National income - ₹8,210 million

Deaths 

 Ghazi ud-Din Khan Feroze Jung I

References